The 2010–11 Meistriliiga season was the 21st season of the Meistriliiga, the top level of ice hockey in Estonia. Three teams participated in the league, and Tartu Välk 494 won the championship.

Regular season

Final 
 Kohtla-Järve Viru Sputnik – Tartu Välk 494 2:3 (9:8 SO, 2:3, 11:2, 5:6, 3:5)

External links
Season on hockeyarchives.ru

Meistriliiga
Meistriliiga (ice hockey) seasons
Meistriliiga